Mathematics and the Search for Knowledge is a book by Morris Kline on the developing mathematics ideas, which are partially overlap with his previous book Mathematics: The Loss of Certainty, as a source of human knowledge about the physical world, starting from astronomical theories of Ancient Greek to the modern theories.

In contrast to the numerous theories, that have appeared since the ancient times up to Newton's theory of gravitation, which are describe different physical phenomena and were often intuitive and can be mechanically explained, but all modern theories, such as electromagnetism, theory of relativity, quantum mechanics, are the mathematical description of reality, which  could not be granted with a clear interpretation, which would be available to human senses.

About the concepts that appear and are used in these theories to describe the physical world, we are the only known - mathematical relationships that they are satisfy (for example, an electromagnetic radiation, wave-particle duality, spacetime, or an electron).

Due to the limitations of our senses capability (for example, from the whole spectrum of electromagnetic radiation the human eye perceives only a small part) and the ability to mislead us (for example, optical illusion), human is forced to use the mathematics as a tool that allows us to not only to compensate the imperfection of our senses, but also to obtain new knowledge, which are not available to our sensory perception.

The author brings us to the idea that the physical world, is not what available to us in our sensation, but rather what human-made mathematical theories say.

Bibliography
 Morris Kline, Mathematics and the Search for Knowledge, Oxford University Press, 1985

Notes

Books about mathematics
1985 non-fiction books